Blackburn College may refer to:

 Blackburn College (Blackburn with Darwen), United Kingdom
 Blackburn College (Illinois), United States